McAuley High School can refer to:

McAuley High School (Cincinnati, Ohio), USA 
McAuley High School (Toledo, Ohio), USA 
McAuley High School (New Zealand)